Evasive Action may refer to:

Evasive Action (webcomic)
Evasive Action, an older computer game

See also 
Evasive maneuvers